The Great Synagogue of Rome attack, which was carried out by armed Palestinian terrorists at the entrance to the Great Synagogue of Rome, took place on 9 October 1982 at 11:55 a.m. A 2-year-old toddler, Stefano Gaj Taché, was killed in the attack, while 37 civilians were injured.

Attack
The attack took place at the Great Synagogue of Rome in the historic district of Rome on Saturday morning, at 11:55 a.m. As the families of the local Jewish community began leaving with their children from the back entrance to the synagogue, five elegantly dressed armed Palestinian attackers walked calmly up to the back entrance of the synagogue and threw at least three hand grenades at the crowd, and afterwards sprayed the crowd with sub-machine gun fire. Eyewitnesses at the scene stated that the hand grenades bounced off the steps and exploded in the street.

A 2-year-old toddler, Stefano Gaj Taché, was killed in the attack after being hit by shrapnel. In addition, 37 civilians were injured, among them Stefano's brother, 4-year-old Gadiel Taché, who was shot in the head and chest.

Eyewitnesses at the scene stated that after the attack, the attackers left the scene in a red Volkswagen and a white Austin.

Perpetrators 
No group claimed responsibility for the attack. Nevertheless, one of the assailants was identified as Osama Abdel al-Zomar, an alleged member of the Abu Nidal terrorist organization. Al-Zomar was later on arrested in Greece, for illegal smuggling of explosives.
Although al-Zomar was convicted by an Italian court for his part in the 1982 attack (while he was in Greek custody), nevertheless, the Greek authorities denied an Italian extradition request and instead deported him in 1989 to Libya, where Abu Nidal's home base was located, and where he is believed to be living.

Aftermath 
A plate has been fixed at the entrance to the synagogue in commemoration of the 1982 Great Synagogue of Rome attack.

On 3 February 2015, during the message to the Italian Parliament following his taking of the oath as President of the Italian Republic, Sergio Mattarella remembered the attack with these words: "(Italy) has paid several times, in a not too distant past, the price of hate and intolerance. I want to remember only one name: Stefano Taché, who was killed in the cowardly terrorist attack on the synagogue in Rome in October 1982. He was only two years old. He was our baby, an Italian baby".

Accusations of Italian Knowledge of the Attack 
In 2008, former Italian prime minister and President of the Republic, Francesco Cossiga claimed that Italy "sold out its Jews" with a secret agreement to not interfere with PLO activities against Jews on the condition that the PLO not conduct attacks against Italy. On December 11th, 2021, the Times of Israel published an article claiming that the Government of Italy knew about the attack beforehand and had reduced security as part of a secret agreement with the PLO from 1973. The article cited newly published government cables. The cables are purported to show that the Servizio per le Informazioni e la Sicurezza Democratica warned the government of Palestinian organizations preparing to attack during the holiday and that a source had indicated that Abu Nidal was preparing to conduct an attack. The articles further claimed that the police presence that should have been at the Synagogue was not present.

See also 
 List of attacks attributed to Abu Nidal
 Neve Shalom Synagogue massacre
 Terrorism in the European Union

References

External links 
 Tot Fights For Life As Rome Hunt For Attackers Goes On - published in Daytona Beach Morning Journal on 9 October 1982
 Terrorists raid Rome synagogue; boy, 2, is killed and 34 are hurt - published in The New York Times on 10 October 1982
 Italy Gives Arab a Life Term In a 1982 Synagogue Attack - published in The New York Times on 24 May 1989
 Italian president joins Rome’s Jews in marking ’82 attack - published in timesofisrael.com on 11 October 2012

1982 murders in Italy
1980s in Rome
1982 mass shootings in Europe
20th-century attacks on synagogues and Jewish communal organizations
Abu Nidal attacks
Attacks on religious buildings and structures in Europe
Explosions in 1982
Explosions in Italy
Jewish Roman (city) history
Mass shootings in Italy
Murder in Rome
October 1982 crimes
October 1982 events in Europe
Palestinian terrorist incidents in Europe
Terrorist incidents in Italy in 1982
Terrorist incidents in Lazio